Two icebreakers have been named Rossiya, romanization of the Russian language word for "Russia":

 , Arktika-class icebreaker launched in 1983 and retired in 2013
 The lead ship of Russian Project 10510 icebreakers will be named Rossiya

Ship names